The Numbering Resource Utilization/Forecast Report (also referred to as the NRUF Report) is a semiannual report compiled by the North American Numbering Plan Administration, based on information provided by the telecom industry in accordance with United States Federal Communications Commission (FCC) rules.

Purpose 

The main purposes of the NRUF report are to a) forecast the exhaust of each area code in the North American Numbering Plan, and b) to forecast the exhaust of the NANP as a whole.  Other uses are made of the report as well, especially in cases of mergers between phone companies, to determine the effects of a proposed merger on the competitive nature of the industry.

Process

Requirements 

U.S. Carriers holding any Central Office Codes are required to submit information regarding their own numbering resource usage to the NANPA twice yearly, by February 1 and August 1 of each year, as required under CFR Title 47, Volume 3, Section 52 (f)(6)(i).  Carriers which fail to submit the required information are at risk of  having further requests for numbering resources being denied.

Canadian Carriers are similarly compelled by regulation to submit NRUF data to the Canadian Radio-television and Telecommunications Commission (CRTC) on an annual basis, no later than December 15 of each year (these reports would be relayed on the 1st NRUF report issued by NANPA for the following year).

Reports 

Following the submission of information from carriers, NRUF reports are compiled and generally are released around the 15th of the month in which reports are due.  As released by NANPA, the reports for individual NPA exhaust sorted by physical location, area code, and exhaust date; also included is information from previous NRUF reports (for the previous six reports), as well as a change from the previous report in terms of a given NPA's exhaust date.

A report detailing the remaining lifespan of the NANP is issued as well, which details the methods used to determine the exhaust date, comparison information and how it relates to the actual estimate, and the final estimate of the exhaust for the Numbering Plan.  When the remaining lifetime is estimated over 30 years, date would be given in the report.

Latest forecasts 

The latest reports available for the NRUF process are available from the NANPA website.

As an example, a forecast released in November 2007 for a reporting period ending July 31, 2007 predicted, at the time of the forecast, there were: 
 1 Area Code(s) projected for exhaust in 2007,
 5 Area Code(s) projected for exhaust in 2008,
 9 Area Code(s) projected for exhaust in 2009.
All other NPAs were projected to exhaust in 2010 or later.

The forecast exhaust for the full NANP at the time of the report was beyond the year 2037. However, a sensitivity analysis — which utilizes a higher gross demand for numbering resources of 7,400 Central Office (CO) codes per year, opposed to the actual estimate of 6,500 — performed as part of the report reflected an exhaust in the year 2038.

References 

 The NANPA website

North American Numbering Plan